Tarek Muhammad Saleh (born November 7, 1974) is a former American football linebacker in the National Football League. He played for the Carolina Panthers (1997–1998) and the Cleveland Browns (1999–2001).  He was born in Woodbridge, Connecticut.  Saleh attended Notre Dame High School (West Haven, Connecticut) and the University of Wisconsin. He is one of the few Palestinian Americans to have played in the NFL.

References

External links 

 Tarek Saleh statistics at databasefootball.com

1974 births
American football linebackers
Carolina Panthers players
Cleveland Browns players
Living people
People from Woodbridge, Connecticut
Players of American football from Connecticut
Sportspeople from New Haven County, Connecticut
Wisconsin Badgers football players
American people of Palestinian descent